Diacamma indicum, also known as Indian queenless ant, is a species of ant of the subfamily Ponerinae. It is found from India, Sri Lanka, and Bangladesh.

References

External links

 at antwiki.org

Ponerinae
Hymenoptera of Asia
Insects described in 1920